Notable people with the surname Harte include:

Film and television
 Betty Harte (1882–1965), American actress in silent film era
 Joby Harte (born 1982), British TV personality
 Robert Harte (New Zealand actor), New Zealand actor

Literature
 Bret Harte (1836–1902), American author and poet
 Emma Harte, a character in novels by Barabara Taylor Bradford
 Jack Harte (Irish writer), Irish short story writer and novelist
 Walter Harte (1709–1774), British poet and historian, friend of Alexander Pope

Music
 Frank Harte (1933–2005), traditional Irish singer
 Leanne Harte, Irish singer-songwriter
 Mickey Joe Harte (born 1973), singer who represented Ireland at Eurovision

Politics
 Dennis J. Harte (1866–1917), New York politician
 Jack Harte (Irish politician) (born 1920), Irish Labour Party senator
 John Harte, Lord Mayor of London (1589-90)
 Paddy Harte (born 1931), Irish politician
 Robert Sheldon Harte (1915–1940), American communist, assistant to Trotsky

Sport
 Bill Harte (born 1971), US soccer player
 Christopher Harte (born 1949), Irish cricketer
 David Harte (Gaelic footballer) (born 1981), Tyrone Gaelic footballer
 Ian Harte, Irish footballer
 Mickey Harte (born 1950s), Gaelic football manager
 Nigel Harte, Westmeath Gaelic footballer
 Pat Harte (active since 2006), Mayo Gaelic footballer
 Patsy Harte (born 1940), Irish hurler in Co. Cork

Other
 Chris Harte, American newspaper publisher
 Edward H. Harte, (1922–2011), American newspaper executive, journalist, philanthropist, and conservationist, son of Houston
 Henry Hickman Harte (1790–1848), Irish mathematician
 Houston Harte (1893–1972), American newspaper publisher, father of Edward
 Verity Harte (born 1949), American philosopher
 Thomas Harte, Irish Republican

See also
 Hart (disambiguation)
 Heart (disambiguation)